Pozole (from , meaning cacahuazintle, a variety of corn or maize) is a traditional soup or stew from Mexican cuisine. It is made from hominy with meat (typically chicken , but possibly pork), and can be seasoned and garnished with shredded lettuce or cabbage, chilli peppers, onion, garlic, radishes, avocado, salsa or limes.  Known in Mesoamerica since the pre-Columbian era, today the stew is common across Mexico and neighboring countries, and is served both as a day-to-day meal and as a festive dish.

Description 

Pozole can be prepared in many ways, but all variations include a base of cooked hominy in broth. Typically pork, or sometimes chicken, is included in the base. Vegetarian recipes substitute beans for the meat. 

The three main types of pozole are blanco (white), verde (green) and rojo (red). White pozole is the preparation without any additional green or red sauce. Green pozole adds a rich sauce based on green ingredients, possibly including tomatillos, epazote, cilantro, jalapeños, or pepitas. Red pozole is made without the green sauce, instead adding a red sauce made from one or more chiles, such as guajillo, piquin, or ancho.

Pozole is commonly served accompanied by a wide variety of condiments. Common condiments include chopped onion, shredded cabbage, sliced radish, avocado, limes, oregano, tostadas, chicharrón, and chiles.

Serving 

Pozole is a typical dish in various states such as Nayarit, Sinaloa, Michoacán, Guerrero, Zacatecas, Jalisco, and Morelos. Pozole is served in Mexican restaurants worldwide. It is also popular (under the older spelling posole) in the cuisine of New Mexico where it was a common dish among the Pueblo Indians residing along the Rio Grande.

Pozole is also a festive dish. In Mexico, pozole is typically served on New Year's Eve to celebrate the new year. Pozole is frequently served as a celebratory dish throughout Mexico and in Mexican communities outside Mexico. Other occasions for serving pozole include Mexican Independence Day, birthdays, Christmas  and other holidays.

History 

Pozole was mentioned in the 16th century Florentine Codex by Bernardino de Sahagún. Since maize was a sacred plant for the Aztecs and other inhabitants of Mesoamerica, pozole was made to be consumed on special occasions. 

According to research by the Instituto Nacional de Antropología e Historia (National Institute of Anthropology and History) and the Universidad Nacional Autónoma de México, on these special occasions, the meat used in the pozole may have been human. Possible archeological evidence of mass cannibalism may support this theory, though many other explanations for this evidence have been proposed, and no eyewitness accounts of Aztec cannibalism are known to exist. Indigenous Nahua writings portray cannibalism as repugnant and abhorrent. Spanish writings included stories of wide-spread and religious cannibalism that were introduced "during post-Conquest religious conversion and Hispanicization.". A paper has been published that suggests the Aztec people received necessary protein from native fauna such as fowl and reptiles as well as beans, which were prominent for the Aztecs.

Gallery

See also 

 Fricasé 
 List of maize dishes
 List of Mexican dishes
 List of soups
 List of stews
 Menudo (soup) – a similar dish made with tripe
 Mexican cuisine

References 

Maize dishes
Mesoamerican cuisine
Mexican soups
Mexican stews